The 1943–44 international cricket season was from September 1943 to April 1944. There were no any international tournament held during this season due to Second World War.

Season overview

November

1943–44 Bombay Pentangular Tournament

References

International cricket competitions by season
1943 in cricket
1944 in cricket